Olaf Lies (born 8 May 1967) is a German politician of the Social Democratic Party (SPD). He was first elected to the Landtag of Lower Saxony in 2008.

Political career 
Lies joined the Social Democratic Party in 2002. In the 2008 state elections he became member of the Landtag of Lower Saxony. He was leader of his party in Lower Saxony from 2010 to 2012.

Minister-President Stephan Weil of Lower Saxony appointed Lies to the position of State Minister for Economics, Labour and Transport in 2013 and later to State Minister for Environment, Energy, Building, and Climate Protection in his cabinet.

In the negotiations to form a coalition government under the leadership of Chancellor Angela Merkel following the 2017 federal elections, Lies was part of the working group on energy, climate protection and the environment, led by Armin Laschet, Georg Nüßlein and Barbara Hendricks.

In the negotiations to form a so-called traffic light coalition of the SPD, the Green Party and the Free Democratic Party (FDP) following the 2021 federal elections, Lies was part of his party's delegation in the working group on agriculture and nutrition, co-chaired by Till Backhaus, Renate Künast and Carina Konrad.

Lies was nominated by his party as delegate to the Federal Convention for the purpose of electing the President of Germany in 2022.

Other activities

Regulatory agencies
 Federal Network Agency for Electricity, Gas, Telecommunications, Post and Railway (BNetzA), Member of the Advisory Board

Corporate boards
 Deutsche Messe, Member of the Supervisory Board
 Volkswagen Group, Member of the supervisory board (since 2013)

Non-profit organizations 
 Business Forum of the Social Democratic Party of Germany, Member of the Political Advisory Board (since 2020)
 German Federal Environmental Foundation (DBU), Member of the Board of Trustees (since 2018)

References

External links 

 Website of Olaf Lies

Ministers of the Lower Saxony State Government
1967 births
People from Wilhelmshaven
Members of the Landtag of Lower Saxony
Living people